Minimum redundancy feature selection is an algorithm frequently used in a method to accurately identify characteristics of genes and phenotypes and narrow down their relevance and is usually described in its pairing with relevant feature selection as Minimum Redundancy Maximum Relevance (mRMR).

Feature selection, one of the basic problems in pattern recognition and machine learning, identifies subsets of data that are relevant to the parameters used and is normally called Maximum Relevance. These subsets often contain material which is relevant but redundant and mRMR attempts to address this problem by removing those redundant subsets. mRMR has a variety of applications in many areas such as cancer diagnosis and speech recognition.

Features can be selected in many different ways. One scheme is to select features that correlate strongest to the classification variable. This has been called maximum-relevance selection. Many heuristic algorithms can be used, such as the sequential forward, backward, or floating selections.

On the other hand, features can be selected to be mutually far away from each other while still having "high" correlation to the classification variable. This scheme, termed as Minimum Redundancy Maximum Relevance (mRMR) selection has been found to be more powerful than the maximum relevance selection.

As a special case, the "correlation" can be replaced by the statistical dependency between variables. Mutual information can be used to quantify the dependency. In this case, it is shown that mRMR is an approximation to maximizing the dependency between the joint distribution of the selected features and the classification variable.

Studies have tried different measures for redundancy and relevance measures. A recent study compared several measures within the context of biomedical images.

References

External links
 Peng, H.C., Long, F., and Ding, C., "Feature selection based on mutual information: criteria of max-dependency, max-relevance, and min-redundancy," IEEE Transactions on Pattern Analysis and Machine Intelligence, Vol. 27, No. 8, pp. 1226–1238, 2005.
 Chris Ding and Hanchuan Peng,  "Minimum Redundancy Feature Selection from Microarray Gene Expression Data".  2nd IEEE Computer Society Bioinformatics Conference (CSB 2003), 11–14 August 2003, Stanford, CA, USA. Pages 523–529.
Penglab mRMR

Machine learning algorithms

zh:最小冗余特征选择